is a three-part original video animation produced by the Anime International Company and IMAGICA Entertainment, and written by Chiaki J. Konaka and Kazuto Nakazawa. The series is set in the Bubblegum Crisis universe and takes place after the events of the original OVA series, from 2034 to 2040. It is set in the city of Megatokyo, and focuses on a division of A.D. Police known as Branch. They are tasked with stopping terrorist activities as well as Boomers (androids) that have become harmful to society.

To date, this is the most recent entry in the Bubblegum Crisis universe to be released.

Plot
Parasite Dolls is set in the original Bubblegum Crisis universe, taking place shortly after the events of the original OVA series. It focuses on a division of A.D. Police called Branch that is tasked with stopping terrorist activities and destroying Boomers that are a threat to society.

Characters 

 Basil "Buzz" Nikvest
Lieutenant Basil "Buzz" Nikvest is a member of the Branch special task force of the AD Police. He was transferred to Branch five years before the story for shooting a child he thought was a boomer. Due to his mistake he is reluctant to carry a sidearm, despite being a gifted marksman. He was made a widower when his wife was killed by a rogue boomer.

 Reiko Michaelson
Sergeant Reiko Michaelson is the heavy weapons and vehicles expert in Branch. She flies a helicopter and is usually at the front lines for fighting Boomers.

 Kouji Takahashi
Kouji Takahashi is the Inspector in charge of Branch operations.

 Rod Kimball
Sergeant Rod Kimball is a Boomer who serves alongside Buzz in Branch. While he cannot hold an official rank, he is treated as a Sergeant. He was also able to identify Reiko's romantic feelings for Buzz. He was killed while saving Reiko from a helicopter assassination.

 Elza "Angel" Lynch
While technically a member of Branch, Lieutenant Elza "Angel" Lynch spends most of her time undercover, investigating the Genom Corporation. She has silver hair and a dark complexion.

 Bill Myers
An electronics and computer hacker, Bill Myers serves as the Branch's Boomer expert. The only person he seems to get along with is Buzz.

Cast 

Additional voices

Japanese: Kouichi Kuriyama, Hajime Iijima, Hiroaki Yoshida, Kenji Nomura, Mitsuru Ogata, Tadahisa Seizen, Toshitaka Shimizu, Yuko Kagata, Yuna Iwaki

English: David Born, Gene Tognacci, George Manley, James Reed Faulkner, Jay Hickman, John Gremillion, John Swasey, John Tyson, Jovan Jackson, Kevin Charles, Mark Laskowski, Matt Culpepper, Mike MacRae, Nancy Novotny, Rob Mungle, Robert Anderson, Sasha Paysinger, Shawn Taylor, Tiffany Grant, Victor Carsrud

Episodes

Reception
Critical reception of Parasite Dolls has been generally positive. Nicoletta Christina Browne of THEM Anime Reviews gave the series a rating of 3 out of 5 stars. She found the installment to be "a good series that doesn't pull many surprises but does make a satisfying if sometimes a bit graphic watch. If one comes in without expectations of greatness and prepared for the violence, you'll likely enjoy it just fine." Browne recommended it for fans of cyberpunk, and also that it would be for mature teens and adults for its graphic violence and implicit sex. 

Chris Beveridge of the Fandom Post found the audio and video for the collection to have no major issues, but disliked the cover artwork. He liked that the series featured some of the "dark underbelly" of the Bubblegum Crisis universe and without the bubblegum or the pop of the previous series and OVAs. He wrote: "This is a cop drama of a sort set in the future that tells three engaging tales and lets the third one really play with the world we’ve come to know. This is the kind of show I want to see as a series, not that other AD Police TV series. This is the good stuff."

Notes

References

External links

 
 

A.D. Police
2003 anime OVAs
ADV Films
Androids in television
Anime International Company
Bubblegum Crisis
Cyberpunk anime and manga
Erotic thriller anime and manga

ja:A.D.POLICE#PARASITE DOLLS